Scenen är vår is a studio album by Bengt Hennings, released in May 2012.

Track listing
Scenen är vår, with Bengt Henningsson, Hasse Schmidt and Sune strand (Leif Melander, Maritha Johansson)
Jag lever nu (Anders Wigelius, Ulf Georgsson)
Stanna hos mig i natt (Why Don't We Spend the Night, Bob McDill, Hasse Carlsson)
Möt mig i Stockholm (Meet Me in Stockholm, Doug Sam, Red Jenkins)
Young and Beautiful (Aaron Schroeder, Abner Silver)
Kärleken går sin egen väg (Peter Åhs, Ulf Georgsson)
Pretty Suzie Sunshine (John L. Finneran, Vincent Finneran)
Only the Lonely (Joe Melson, Roy Orbison)
Lördagskväll i parken (Leif Melander, Peter Nord)
Bee Gees medley (Barry Gibb, Maurice Gibb, Robin Gibb)
Islands in the Stream
Heartbreaker
How Deep Is Your Love
More Than a Woman
Euphoria (Thomas G:son, Peter Boström)
På en våg av kärlek (Tommy Andersson, Camilla Andersson)

Chart positions

References 

2012 albums
Bengt Hennings albums